:Sierra Leone is a country in West Africa with a North Atlantic Ocean coastline to the west. It lies on the African Plate. The island's main geographical features include wooded hill country, an upland plateau, and mountains in the east. The coastline has a belt of mangrove swamps. Freetown, the nation's capital city, has one of the world's largest natural harbours. The Rokel River is the largest river in Sierra Leone.

It is bordered by Guinea to the north and northeast, and Liberia to the south and southeast.

Physical geography

Sierra Leone is located on the west coast of Africa, between the 7th and 10th parallels north of the equator. Sierra Leone is bordered by Guinea to the north and northeast, Liberia to the south and southeast, and the Atlantic Ocean to the west.

Sierra Leone has four distinct geographical regions: coastal Guinean mangroves, the wooded hill country, an upland plateau, and the eastern mountains.

Geology
Sierra Leone can be split into three geological areas, in the east is part of the West African craton, the western area consists of the Rokelides, an orogenic belt, and a 20- to 30-km coastal strip of sediments.

Extreme points 
This is a list of the extreme points of Sierra Leone, the points that are farther north, south, east or west than any other location.

 Northernmost point – the northern section of the border with Guinea, Northern Province*
 Easternmost point – the tripoint with Guinea and Liberia, Eastern Province
 Southernmost point – unnamed peninsula south of the town of Mano Salija at the mouth of the Mano River, Southern Province
 Westernmost point –  the point at which the border with Guinea enters the Atlantic Ocean, North West Province
 *Note: Sierra Leone does not have a northernmost point, the border being formed here by 10th parallel north

Climate 

The climate is tropical; although it could be classified as a tropical monsoon climate, it could also be described as a climate that is transitional between a continually wet tropical rainforest climate and a tropical savanna climate.

There are two seasons; dry season (NovemberMay) and rainy season (JuneOctober). 

December to January are the coolest months of the year, although temperatures can still exceed 40°C, lower to moderate humidity makes the heat around this time of the year more tolerable. Unlike March and April, the months that it gets hot and humid with temperatures around 33°C – 36°C and a solid 50% humidity, making the heat index higher than the actual temperature. The average sea temperature is 30°C. 

C (6)s   to  year.

Average rainfall is highest at the coast, 3000–5000 mm per year; moving inland this decreases and at the eastern border of the country, the average rainfall is 2000–2500 mm.

Environment issues 

Rapid population growth in Sierra Leone has put pressure upon the natural environment. Environmental problems include the overharvesting of timber, the expansion of cattle grazing and slash and burn agriculture have resulted in deforestation and soil exhaustion, and overfishing.

Sierra Leone is party to several environmental agreements:
Biodiversity (Convention on Biological Diversity)
Climate Change (United Nations Framework Convention on Climate Change)
Desertification (United Nations Convention to Combat Desertification)
Endangered Species (CITES)
Law of the Sea (UNCLOS or LOS)
Marine Life Conservation (Convention on Fishing and Conservation of Living Resources of the High Seas)
Nuclear Test Ban (CTBT)
Ramsar Convention(Wetlands)

Signed, but not ratified:
Environmental Modification (ENMOD)

General information

Geographic coordinates: 
Land boundaries:
total: 1,0938 km
border countries: Guinea 794 km, Liberia 299 km

Coastline: 402 km

Maritime claims:
territorial sea: .
contiguous zone: .
exclusive economic zone: .
continental shelf: 200 m depth or to the depth of exploitation.

Climate: tropical; hot, humid; summer rainy season (May to December); winter dry season (December to April)

Terrain: coastal belt of mangrove swamps, wooded hill country, upland plateau, mountains in east

Elevation extremes:
lowest point: Atlantic Ocean 0 m
highest point: Loma Mansa (Bintimani) 1,948 m

Natural resources: diamonds, titanium ore, bauxite, iron ore, gold, chromite

Land use:
arable land: 24.4%
permanent crops: 2.3%
permanent pasture: 30.5%
forest: 37.5%
other: 6.3% (2011)

Irrigated land: 300 km²; (2012)

Total renewable water resources: 160 km3; (2011)

Natural hazards: dry, sand-laden harmattan winds blow from the Sahara (December to February); sandstorms, dust storms

See also
Protected areas of Sierra Leone
Administrative divisions of Sierra Leone

References

Sources